Amrapara is a village in Amrapara CD block in Pakur subdivision of Pakur district in the Indian state of Jharkhand.

Geography

Location

Overview
Rajmahal coalfield is shown in the map. The entire area is overwhelmingly rural with only small pockets of urbanisation.

Note: The full screen map is interesting. All places marked on the map are linked and you can easily move on to another page of your choice. Enlarge the map to see what else is there – one gets railway links, many more road links and so on.

Demographics
According to the 2011 Census of India, Amrapara had a total population of 3,898, of which 1,984 (51%) were males and 1,914 (49%) were females. Population in the age range 0–6 years was 626. The total number of literate persons in Amrapara was 2,293 (70.08% of the population over 6 years).

Civic administration

Police station
Amrapara police station serves Amrapara CD block.

CD block HQ
Headquarters of Amrapara CD block is at Amrapara village.

Education
Rajkiyakrit High School is a Hindi-medium coeducational institution established in 1949. It has facilities for teaching from class IX to class XII.

Model School Amrapara is an English-medium coeducational institution established in 2012. It has facilities for teaching from class VI to class XII.

Project High School Amrapara is a Hindi-medium girls only institution established in 1950. It has facilities for teaching from class VIII to class X.

References

Villages in Pakur district